Sara Lance, also known by her alter-ego White Canary,  is a fictional character in The CW's Arrowverse franchise, first introduced in the 2012 pilot episode of the television series Arrow, and later starring in Legends of Tomorrow. The character is an original character to the television series, created by Greg Berlanti, Marc Guggenheim and Andrew Kreisberg, but incorporates character and plot elements of the DC Comics character Black Canary. Sara was portrayed by Jacqueline MacInnes Wood in the pilot episode, but subsequently by Caity Lotz.

Sara initially goes by the moniker of The Canary, a translation of her Arabic League of Assassins name . She later adopts the code name of White Canary before joining the Legends of Tomorrow, and eventually becoming the captain of the team.

Lotz has appeared as Sara Lance and her superhero persona in crossovers on The Flash, Supergirl and Batwoman, all set within the Arrowverse. The character has also appeared in a digital comic book series.

Appearances

Arrow
Sara Lance first appears in the pilot episode of Arrow as the younger sister of Laurel Lance. It's shown that five years prior to the beginning of the series, she was having a secret affair with her sister's boyfriend Oliver Queen and was with him on his family yacht when it shipwrecked. Everyone on board was presumed dead but flashbacks in season two reveal that, like Oliver, Sara actually survived the experience. She was rescued by a research boat, the Amazo, and when Oliver was captured by the ship's crew, Sara helped him escape. Together, along with Oliver's friend Slade Wilson, they attacked the ship. Due to Slade's love for Shado, an ally who was killed indirectly because of Oliver who was being forced to choose who to live between Sara and Shado, Slade betrayed Oliver and took over both the ship and Oliver as his prisoner. Oliver and Sara confronted him on the freighter and Sara was swept away in the current, causing Oliver to believe that she died once again. However, Sara was found by Nyssa al Ghul, who took her to Nanda Parbat. She and Nyssa became lovers, and Sara became a deadly fighter with the League of Assassins under the name Ta-er al-Sahfer, roughly translated to "Yellow Bird" or "Canary" from Arabic.

In season two, Sara returns to Starling City after a six-year absence as "The Canary" to protect her family. In keeping with a promise, she also befriends wayward teenager Sin and watches over her. Oliver manages to capture and unmask The Canary, revealing Sara to be alive. She eventually informs her father, SCPD Detective Quentin Lance, and looks after him and Laurel (who also later discovers she's alive and is a vigilante). Sara joins Team Arrow and revisits a brief relationship with Oliver. She aids him and his colleagues Felicity Smoak, John Diggle, and Roy Harper in taking down a drug-enhanced Slade Wilson, with help from the League of Assassins, which requires Sara to return to Nanda Parbat.

In season three, Sara is killed on a rooftop with three arrows to the chest. Some time later, it is revealed that Thea Queen killed Sara after being drugged by her father Malcolm Merlyn/Dark Archer as part of a plot to pit Oliver against Ra's al Ghul. Meanwhile, Laurel takes up Sara's mantle to fight crime as the Black Canary.

In season four, Laurel resurrects Sara using the League's mystical Lazarus Pit. The process is successful, but Sara is brought back to life without a soul, making her feral and dangerous. Oliver calls his old friend John Constantine to assist them in restoring Sara's soul. Days later, Sara aids in rescuing Ray Palmer/The Atom from the hands of Damien Darhk, before leaving town to find herself, eventually joining the Legends along with Ray. During her time away with the Legends, Laurel is killed by Darhk and Sara is later made aware of it by Quentin when she briefly returns to present-day Star City at the end of season one of Legends of Tomorrow, where she and Quentin mourn Laurel together.

Sara, along with Ray and the rest of the Legends, return for the season five crossover "Invasion!" when Barry Allen/The Flash and his team contact her, informing her and the Legends that they and the rest of the heroes in the present day need help fighting an invasion from an alien race known as the Dominators. The Legends arrive and meet up with Team Flash and Team Arrow, then introduce themselves to Barry's friend from Earth-38 Kara Danvers/Supergirl, whom he had brought over to help combat the Dominators. After Oliver appoints Barry leader of the group, they all spar with Kara to practice fighting aliens, and are repeatedly defeated. Meanwhile, Sara develops a small friendship with Kara. When Barry is forced to reveal that he had gone back in time to save his mother and then reversed the decision, which has now altered some of the group's lives a bit, Sara scolds him and everyone except Oliver and a few others lose faith in Barry. Kara leads Sara and the others, while Barry and Oliver stay behind to rescue the president from the Dominators. This ends with the president being killed and the Dominators using a device to mind-control the entire group. Sara returns with the rest of the mind-controlled heroes and attacks Barry and Oliver, until Barry tricks Kara into destroying the device, freeing them. They regroup and after they reaffirm their faith in Barry, five of them (Sara, Oliver, Ray, Thea, and Diggle) are abducted by the Dominators and placed in pods that put them in a shared dream world, where Sara, Oliver, and Oliver's father never got on the Queen's Gambit and all of Oliver fallen friends, including Laurel, are still alive. In this dream world, Oliver and Laurel are engaged, and while Sara helps Laurel get ready for their wedding, she begins having memory flashes of her actual life. Sara later saves Oliver and Diggle from a manifestation of Deathstroke, and the three realize that the world they're in isn't real. They later rally Ray and Thea and attempt to leave, but are forced to fight manifestations of Malcolm, Slade, Darhk, and their mercenaries before killing all of them. Sara and Oliver share a heartbreaking goodbye with Laurel. They wake up on the Dominator ship in the real world and escape in a pod before being rescued by the Legends’ timeship Waverider. They conclude that the dream world was a distraction meant to keep them busy while the Dominators probed their minds for information on metahumans. They return to earth, and as some of the Legends—along with Felicity and Cisco Ramon—head to the past and attempt to abduct a dominator, Sara, Barry, Oliver, and Ray confront a group of secret service agents who attempt to kill them. They defeat the agents, whose leader informs them that the Dominators are after metahumans because they are aware that Barry has changed the timeline. The Dominators now perceive them as a threat. Barry attempts to surrender himself to the Dominators in exchange for their leaving earth, but Sara and the rest of the heroes persuade him not to. She pilots the Waverider with Cisco to hold the Dominator's freefalling metabomb in place with a tractor beam while Jefferson Jackson/Firestorm transforms it into harmless water and the heroes on the ground use a pain-inflicting device to force the Dominators to flee. Sara and the other heroes are honored by the new President later that night and they celebrate, before sharing a hug with Oliver and returning to the Waverider with the rest of the Legends.

Sara briefly returns in season six when she receives a call from her sister's doppelgänger, the recently reformed criminal from Earth-2 Laurel Lance / Black Siren, who informs her that Quentin had been seriously injured in the battle against Ricardo Diaz and is in the hospital. Sara arrives and meets her deceased sister's doppelgänger, who had developed a genuine father-daughter relationship with Quentin; they refer to each other as such.  Sara thanks Earth-2 Laurel for calling her; Laurel thanks her for coming. Laurel tells her that the doctors are optimistic that Quentin will make it and asks Sara if it's weird seeing her. Sara replies that it is, a little. Sara asks if she is like her Laurel, and Laurel replies that she hardly is at all, clearly disappointed with herself. The two witness Oliver being arrested for being the Green Arrow per the condition of his agreement with the FBI, in exchange for their help in the fight against Diaz and his allies. The doctor comes and informs everyone present that Quentin has died from lack of oxygen to his brain during surgery, leaving Sara, Laurel, Oliver, and the rest of Team Arrow devastated. Later, as Oliver (under the direction of the FBI) announces to the world on live TV that he is the Green Arrow, before being taken to prison, Sara and Laurel mourn together over Quentin's body.

In season seven, Sara returns when Felicity summons her to convince Black Siren to stop her crime spree after her crimes and being framed for murder. After they and Dinah stop Shadow Thief. Sara helps Black Siren come to terms with Quention's death.

In season eight, Sara witnesses Oliver's sacrifice to create Earth-Prime and attends his funeral.

Legends of Tomorrow
In the spin-off series, Legends of Tomorrow, Sara is recruited by Rip Hunter to a time travelling team of rejects aimed at defeating the immortal villain Vandal Savage. Before she departs, Laurel gives Sara the White Canary name and outfit to signify her new start. Over the course of the first season, Sara continues her battle with blood-lust and sets in motion the events that will lead to her own rescue by Nyssa. While she romances many women throughout history, she develops a budding flirtatious relationship with Leonard Snart, who bonds with her due to their common history as killers and desire to redeem themselves. Though Sara is slow to return his feelings, Snart finally admits his love for her near the end of the season, and the two share a kiss just before Snart sacrifices himself for the team. Sara mourns Snart's death and admits that he died a hero. The Legends return to 2016 a few months after they left and Sara is devastated to learn of Laurel's murder. Sara wants to go back and save her sister but Rip tells her that would only get herself and her father killed.

In season two, Sara becomes captain of the timeship Waverider and leader of the Legends following Rip's disappearance. She mercilessly hunts her sister's killer, Damien Darhk, throughout history before accepting that she cannot bring Laurel back due to the delicacy of time. In the "Invasion!" crossover event, Sara and the Legends return to 2016 to aid Team Arrow, Team Flash, and Earth-38's Supergirl in repelling the Dominators' alien invasion. In the second-season finale, Sara is forced to use the Spear of Destiny to save reality from the Legion of Doom. While tempted to rewrite her own tragic history, the Spear briefly reunites Sara with a projection of Laurel, who encourages Sara to do what's right and make peace with her death. Sara then chooses to render the Spear itself inert, foiling the evil plans of Eobard Thawne/Reverse Flash and allowing him to be killed by the Black Flash, who has been hunting him all season.

In season three of Legends, Sara continues to lead the Waverider crew as they track down and repair anachronisms throughout time, working in an antagonistic partnership with Rip Hunter's new bureaucratic organization, the Time Bureau. In the four-part crossover "Crisis on Earth-X", Sara travels to 2017 to attend the wedding of Barry Allen and Iris West, where she has a one-night stand with Supergirl's adoptive sister Alex Danvers.The assembled heroes work together to repel an invading Nazi army from the alternate world of Earth-X. While confronting the demonic entity Mallus alongside her old friend John Constantine, Sara and Constantine hook up, despite her ongoing romantic tension with Time Bureau agent Ava Sharpe. Ava and Sara begin dating in subsequent episodes, but break up after Sara is temporarily possessed by Mallus through the death totem and reasons that, given her history with death and destruction, she poses a danger to Ava.

Despite this setback, they soon get back together, with the two shown to be in a stable relationship by the time of the Legends removing Paul Revere from the height of Beatlemania. Season four of Legends focuses on Sara leading the team to track down magical "fugitives" of mythology from around the timestream, with the support of Ava and the Time Bureau. In season five, after the Time Bureau is no more, Ava is co-captain of the Waverider and helps the team track down the "encores", evil criminals returned from hell to different points on the timeline. In season six, Sara is abducted by aliens, later revealed to be employed by Bishop, a scientist from the 22nd century and Ava’s creator, who wants Sara to work with him in an attempt to restart the human race with alien-human hybrids. After being fatally poisoned by an alien, Bishop clones Sara and transfers her dying mind into her new body that is spliced with alien DNA granting Sara regenerative abilities. Although horrified by what Bishop has done to her and no longer sure of who she is, Mick convinces her that she is still herself. After escaping the alien world with Mick and Gary, Sara returns to Earth and proposes to Ava who gladly accepts. The two eventually wed in 1925, during an alien invasion caused by Bishop which the Legends eventually manage to stop. However, before the Legends able to leave 1925, an unknown second Waverider destroyed the original Waverider. 

During season seven, Sara is stranded in 1925 with the rest of the Legends. While trying to get back to 2021, they learn that the second Waverider was commanded by Bishop along with an evil version of Gideon, who later deploys robot versions of themselves to eliminate the Legends. Sara and the Legends try to get to Gwyn Davies in New York, the person who invented time travel, in order to help them get back home. At the end of season seven, it is revealed that Sara is pregnant with Ava's baby. When she returned to the Waverider, she was arrested by the Time Police alongside her team for breaking the timeline.

Creation and development
Jacqueline MacInnes Wood was cast as Sara Lance in March 2012. Caity Lotz was announced to be playing Arrow's version of Black Canary during July 2013. During the same month it was revealed that her character is Sara, who had survived the Queen's Gambit shipwreck.

According to Arrow producer Andrew Kreisberg, Sara was originally meant to be Ravager but they decided to give that role to Summer Glau's character Isabel Rochev instead. After the switch was made, Sara was made into the Canary.

After the character's death during the shows third season, it was announced in February 2015 that Caity Lotz would become a cast member on Legends of Tomorrow, though it was not until May that they revealed she would continue to play Sara instead of a new character.

Originally known for her martial arts prowess, in July 2019 it was announced that Sara would develop a superpower during the fifth season of Legends of Tomorrow, later revealed to be precognition.

Other versions
 An alternate version of Sara is mentioned on Earth-X where the Nazis won World War II and proceed to conquer the rest of their world. Like her Earth-1 counterpart she was bisexual; when her father, an SS Sturmbannführer, discovered this he killed her.
 In the episode "Starling City", it is referred that Earth-2's Laurel Lance has a sister. It is unclear whether this is actually Sara's doppelganger, though Laurel does mention in the episode "Green Arrow & The Canaries" that like Sara she slept with Earth-2's Oliver.
 In the crossover "Crisis on Infinite Earths", on Earth-16 (a world like Earth-1, but with no fantastical elements), Oliver Queen became the Green Arrow, but Sara Lance actually did die on the Queen's Gambit and thus never became the White Canary.
 During the "Armageddon" event, it is mentioned that Sara (and other Legends, including Ray and Nate) was murdered by Damien Darhk and a Reverse-Flash version of Barry Allen in the Reverse-Flashpoint timeline created by Eobard Thawne.

Reception
The revelation in the season two episode, "Heir to the Demon", that Sara is bisexual and has been in a relationship with Nyssa al Ghul was positively received by critics as it made her the first character from either Marvel or DC to be explicitly shown as bisexual in either the movies or TV shows. IGN's Jesse Schedeen praised the relationship between Sara and Wentworth Miller's character Leonard Snart, as well as the chemistry between Lotz and Miller, calling their "faint romantic tension that existed between [them] since the first episode" containing more weight than many of the other relationships on the show.

In other media
 Sara Lance also features in the tie-in novel Arrow: Fatal Legacies which was released in January 2018. The novel focuses on events between the fifth-season finale and sixth-season premiere of Arrow and is co-authored by Arrow executive producer Marc Guggenheim and author James R. Tuck.
 White Canary is a playable character in the mobile-exclusive edition of Injustice 2, with her Legends of Tomorrow attire available as an alternate skin for Black Canary.

References

American female characters in television
DC Comics American superheroes
Arrow (TV series) characters
Characters created by Marc Guggenheim
Crossover characters in television
Fictional clones
DC Comics LGBT superheroes
DC Comics female superheroes
DC Comics martial artists
DC Comics characters with accelerated healing
DC Comics television characters
DC Comics hybrids
Fictional bisexual females
Fictional characters with precognition
Fictional eskrimadors
Fictional extraterrestrial–human hybrids
Fictional female assassins
Fictional Jeet Kune Do practitioners
Fictional LGBT characters in television
Fictional murderers
Fictional ship captains
Fictional stick-fighters
Fictional vigilantes
Fictional Wing Chun practitioners
Legends of Tomorrow characters
Supergirl (TV series) characters
Television characters introduced in 2012
Time travelers
The Flash (2014 TV series) characters
Characters created by Greg Berlanti
Characters created by Andrew Kreisberg
Black Canary